Maad Ibrahim Majid (born 30 June 1960) is an Iraqi football defender who played for Iraq in the 1986 FIFA World Cup. He also played for Al-Rasheed Club.

Maad Ibrahim was a strong and uncompromising defender who was part of 1986 World Cup squad in Mexico. Maad made his name with Al-Tijara, Al-Shurta and  Al-Qowa Al-Jawia. 

He earned him a place in Iraq’s 1986 World Cup squad in Mexico, where he played in the last game against the hosts in place of suspended Al-Rasheed team-mate Samir Shaker in the centre of defence alongside Al-Jawiya legend Nadhim Shaker.

References

External links
 FIFA profile

1960 births
Iraqi footballers
Iraq international footballers
Association football defenders
1986 FIFA World Cup players
Living people
Al-Shorta SC players